Lisbeth F.K. Holter Brudal (born 19 September 1935) is a Norwegian psychologist living in Oslo, Norway. She is particularly known for her pioneer work in the areas of birth psychology and communication.

Biography
Lisbeth F.K. Holter Brudal is the granddaughter of Anathon August Fredrik Aall (1867 – 1943) who internationally was a well known philosopher and psychologist.

Aall was one of the founders of Institute of Psychology in Oslo in 1909. Aall was professor and leader of Institute of Psychology for nearly 30 years.

Lisbeth F.K. Holter Brudal graduated as a psychologist in 1964. She has a Doctor of Philosophy degree from the Faculty of Medicine at the University of Oslo (PhD.), specialising in clinical psychology. She is married to psychologist Paul Jan Brudal, who is a specialist in clinical psychology and an author. They have two children and five grandchildren.

Work
For several years Brudal was a lecturer and assistant professor at the Institute of Psychology at the University of Oslo. In 1985 she founded the Institute of Tocology (the study of birth) and Family Psychology which is a private institute, and she remained head of the institute until 2011. The institute has at times had four affiliated psychologists, focusing especially on the treatment of people in crisis. For many years the institute collaborated with the university's Institute of Psychology in the areas of guidance and teaching of students. In 2012 specialist in clinical psychology Gro Vatne Brean became the new head of the Institute of Tocology and Family Psychology.

In 2016 founded Lisbeth F.K. Holter Brudal together with colleagues the Institute of Empathic Communication (IEC).  She is head of the institute.

Brudal is especially known for having developed a separate area within psychology: Birth Psychology. In the context of this pioneering work she has done research on men's psychological reactions associated with pregnancy, childbirth and postnatal care. She has taught for many years, held courses and supervised health workers in birth psychology and crisis intervention in Sweden. For this work Brudal now receives a pension from Sweden.

Lisbeth F.K. Holter Brudal is also a pioneer in the field of communication, having developed a tool for communication - Empathic Communication (EC). She has published a series of films about this tool and its usage. Brudal is known for her versatile professional profile and has published 18 books and several articles on subjects such as birth psychology, psychological crises, psychopathy, dreams, consciousness, positive psychology and empathy. The books have been translated into several languages, including Russian. She has also written a novel.

In 2015 Lisbeth F.K.Brudal launched her book: Empathic Communication: The Missing Link. In January 2015 the book was no. 1 on the best seller list on Amazon in three categories: Emotions & Feelings, Parenting, Professional Development.

In 2017 Lisbeth F.K.Brudal published her article: Dialogic Moments and Empathic Communication.

In 2018 Lisbeth F.K.Brudal launched her book: Hva er Empatisk Kommunikasjon?
. The book is a handbook supplement to Empathic Communication: The Missing Link.

Awards
2015 - Amazon Bestseller - Lisbeth Holter Brudal - «Empathic Communication: The Missing Link»

Lisbeth F.K. Holter Brudal has been awarded with the King's Medal of Merit in Gold in 2011, she won the media prize from The Norwegian Psychological Association in 2007 and won the prize from "Birth in Focus" in 1995.

Bibliography

Doctoral Thesis
 Psykiske reaksjoner hos kvinner og menn i tilknytning til fødsel, del I, II og lll. Det medisinske fakultet.  Universitet i Oslo 1981.

Textbooks
Fødselens psykologi. Lærebok i forebyggende arbeid. Aschehoug 1983. 
Psykiske reaksjoner i et nytt perspektiv. Tano 1989. 
Helsepsykologi. Aktivering av psykiske ressurser ved sykdom. Tano 1993. 
Drømmepsykologi. Om drøm, bevissthet og kreativitet. Co-Author: Jan Brudal. Universitetsforlaget 1996. 
Psykiske reaksjoner ved svangerskap, fødsel og barseltid. 3. opplag. Fagbokforlaget 2008. 
Drømmens psykologi. Ny forståelse og praktisk bruk av drøm. Co-Author: Paul Jan Brudal. Fagbokforlaget 2008. 
Positiv psykologi. 3. opplag. Fagbokforlaget 2010. 
Empatisk Kommunikasjon. Et verktøy for menneskemøter. 2. opplag. Gyldendal Akademisk 2016.

Popular Science
Å få barn. Fødselspsykologi for foreldre. 4. opplag. Aschehoug 1979. 
En reise i rommet.  Vårt ytre og indre univers. Aschehoug 1987. 
Dødsbevissthet. Om å velge livet eller døden. Universitetsforlaget 1989. 
Ventetiden. Universitetsforlaget 1996. 
Kunsten å være foreldre. 2. opplag. Fagbokforlaget 2004. 
Psykopat?  Historier fra virkeligheten. 2. opplag. Fagbokforlaget 2008. 
Mot. Psykologi i hverdagen. Fagbokforlaget 2010. 
Om bevissthet. Psykologi. Mindfulness. Science fiction. Nær-døden-erfaringer. Kosmisk bevissthet. Fagbokforlaget 2011.

Novels
Mannen fra Ur. Abrahams reise fra Ur til Det hellige land. Solum forlag 2001.

E-Books
Hva er empatisk Kommunikasjon? 8 essay med eksempler på implementering og bruk av Empatisk Kommunikasjon på tvers av områder, som ledelse, pasient arbeid, rådgivning, veiledning og i vår hverdag. Håndboken er et supplement til læreboken Empatisk Kommunikasjon. Et verktøy for menneskemøter. 2016.

References

Psychologists from Oslo
Norwegian women psychologists
University of Oslo alumni
1935 births
Living people